Myra Sidharta (born Auw Jong Tjhoen Moy  on 6 March 1927) was born in Belitung. She is an expert in Tionghoa Malay literature, a psychologist and a columnist for Indonesian magazines including The Jakarta Post.

She has an autobiography titled In Search of My Ancestral Home

Sidharta was married to Dr. Priguna Sidharta (Sie Pek Giok) and has 3 children, Sylvia, Julie and Amir Sidharta, who works as a curator. She has five grandchildren:  David Leibovic, Jonathan Leibovic, Daniel Leibovic, Radyatra Sidharta, and Prajnacita Sidharta.

Education
Her grandfather, an immigrant from Meixian, Guangdong, China, was afraid that his grandchildren would lose their identity as Chinese. Therefore, he encouraged Sidharta to learn Mandarin. Fortunately for Sidharta, there was a female Mandarin teacher staying in her grandparents' house who could teach her.

She obtained a master's degree in psychology from Rijks Universitet, Leiden, Netherlands.

She speaks German, Dutch, French, Mandarin, Hokkien, Malay, Indonesian and English.

In Search of My Ancestral Home
In her autobiography, she revealed that in 1872, her grandfather's family was not rich and they had to sell his youngest brother to obtain passage money overseas, and also to leave some money for his mother, who was going to stay behind.

When China became a Communist country, and Indonesia was declared independent, her grandfather's family had to choose between Dutch or Indonesian citizenship.

She also discussed the many discriminatory rules experienced by ethnic Chinese of Indonesia in the 1950s, which caused many Chinese to decide to leave for China.

She details her journey to Meixian and how being with her relatives in China brought her happiness.

References

External links
 Dokumentasi Sastra Melayu Tionghoa
 In Collapsing Economy, Local Chinese Scapegoated

Indonesian columnists
Indonesian people of Chinese descent
Indonesian writers
Indonesian women writers
People from Meixian District
1927 births
Possibly living people
Hakka writers
Indonesian women columnists